Lawrence Tanter (born October 11, 1949) is an American public address announcer best known for his work for the Los Angeles Lakers of the National Basketball Association. In addition, Tanter was also the program director for public jazz radio station KKJZ.

Early life
Tanter was born in Chicago. He played basketball in high school, as well as the saxophone and clarinet. A  forward, he earned an athletic scholarship to play basketball at the University of Dubuque. He worked at the college radio station after responding to an ad for a host for a Sunday night jazz program.

Professional career
Tanter began working at radio station KJLH in Los Angeles in the 1970s, and drove their quiet storm format.

Tanter began working as the Lakers' public address announcer at the start of the NBA's 1981-82 season and has been a fixture at Laker home games ever since. He is the longest tenured Lakers PA announcer ever. During his tenure behind the microphones of both The Forum and the Crypto.com Arena, Tanter has seen the Lakers win 16 NBA Western Conference titles and 10 NBA championships.

When World Wrestling Entertainment fought with the Denver Nuggets over an arena booking for a playoff game in 2009, Tanter was recruited as guest ring announcer for the main event of a newly relocated Raw at Staples Center. In the match, five heel (villain) wrestlers in Denver Nuggets jerseys competed against five face (hero) wrestlers in Los Angeles Lakers jerseys, and the Lakers team won. Soon afterward, the Lakers eliminated the Nuggets in the 2009 Western Conference Finals 4-2. They then went on to defeat the Orlando Magic in the 2009 NBA Finals and capture their 15th NBA title.

Tanter played an instrumental role in re-creating a home feel for Lakers "home" games in the 2020 NBA Bubble, as the league returned to action following a hiatus due to the ongoing coronavirus pandemic in the United States. Tanter recorded an array of starting lineup introductions, accounting for potential lineup permutations and team accomplishments, at a home studio in the Porter Ranch area of Los Angeles in July. Matt Shelton, the Lakers' director of game entertainment, then spliced together Tanter's tracks using Adobe Audition editing software. As the Lakers advanced in the postseason, Tanter was a part of the game presentation. The Lakers went on to win their 17th NBA championship.

Tanter is known for his smooth baritone voice and affinity for jazz music. For three decades, he has been a disc jockey for various jazz stations in Los Angeles, including KTWV 94.7 The Wave. Additionally, he is the announcer for LTV, the Lakers pre/post game show on KCAL-TV.

References

Living people
American sports announcers
Dubuque Spartans men's basketball players
Los Angeles Lakers
Los Angeles Lakers announcers
National Basketball Association public address announcers
People from Chicago
People from Los Angeles
1949 births